Kuzhandaiyum Deivamum is a 1965 Indian Tamil-language children's film directed by Krishnan–Panju. It is based on the American film The Parent Trap (1961) which in turn was based on Erich Kästner's 1949 German novel Lisa and Lottie. The film stars Jaishankar and Jamuna, with Nagesh, Sundarrajan, G. Varalakshmi, Santha, Kutty Padmini, M. S. S. Bhagayam and V. R. Thilagam in supporting roles. It tells the story of twin sisters attempting to reunite their separated parents.

The film, produced by AVM Productions and featuring music by M. S. Viswanathan, was released on 19 November 1965. It was a commercial success, and won the National Film Award for Best Feature Film in Tamil. Krishnan–Panju remade the film twice; in Telugu as Leta Manasulu (1966) and in Hindi as Do Kaliyaan (1967). It was also remade in Malayalam as Sethubandhanam (1974) and in Kannada as Makkala Bhagya (1976).

Plot 

Twins Lalitha and Padmini get separated at birth because of their parent's separation. Later, the sisters decide to reunite their parents and work together for it.

Cast 
Male cast
 Jaishankar as Chandrasekar "Sekar"
 Nagesh as Sundaram
 Sundarrajan as Ramalingam

Female cast
 Jamuna as Sathyabama "Bama"
 G. Varalakshmi as Alamelu
 Santha as Nirmala
 Kutty Padmini Lalitha "Lalli" and Padmini "Pappi"
 M. S. S. Bhagayam as Sogusamma
 V. R. Thilagam as Pankajam

Production

Development 
M. Kumaran of AVM Productions saw the American film The Parent Trap (1961), based on Erich Kästner's German novel Lisa and Lottie, and saw potential for a Tamil version of it; he persuaded his brother Saravanan to watch the film. Saravanan complied, but was sceptical over the story's commercial viability if filmed in Tamil and also felt audience would not be receptive towards the concept of divorce, although Kumaran remained adamant. They later asked Javar Seetharaman to watch The Parent Trap and if he could Indianise it in his screenplay; AVM was impressed with his screenplay. Saravanan said Seesumpatti Rajagopal wrote the climax portions. Krishnan–Panju were selected to direct the film, titled Kuzhandaiyum Deivamum. Cinematography was handled by S. Maruti Rao and G. Vittal Rao, art direction by A. K. Sekar, and Panju edited the film under the pseudonym "Panjabi".

Casting and filming 

Jaishankar was selected to play the male lead and was paid . Kutty Padmini portrayed twin sisters; in the scenes where both characters appear, split screen and body double techniques were used. The climax was shot at Palani.

Soundtrack 
The music was composed by M. S. Viswanathan and the lyrics were written by Vaali and Kannadasan. The song "Pazhamuthir Solaiyile" is set in the Abheri raga, and "Enna Vegam Nillu Bhama" is set in Shivaranjani. The song "Anbulla Maanvizhiye" was remixed by Rafi in the film Jaggubhai (2010). Randor Guy of The Hindu wrote, "One of the major factors contributing to the success of the movie was its melodious music composed by M. S. Viswanathan. Many of the songs became hits and are still remembered today".

Release and reception 
Kuzhandaiyum Deivamum was released on 19 November 1965. The Tamil magazine Ananda Vikatan, in a review dated 19 December 1965, applauded Padmini's performance and stated that she was the sole reason to watch the film, which the reviewer called childish. Writing for Sport and Pastime, T. M. Ramachandran criticised the film's lack of originality, but called it a "clever adaptation" of The Parent Trap, and described Padmini's dual role performance as the film's "pièce de résistance". Kalki appreciated the cast performances, but criticised the film for lacking AVM's signature touch. The film was a commercial success, running for over 100 days in theatres. At the 13th National Film Awards, it won in the Best Tamil Film category.

Remakes 
Krishnan–Panju remade the film twice; in Telugu as Leta Manasulu (1966) and in Hindi as Do Kaliyaan (1967). It was also remade in Malayalam as Sethubandhanam (1974) and in Kannada as Makkala Bhagya (1976).

References

Bibliography

External links 
 

1960s children's films
1960s Tamil-language films
1965 films
AVM Productions films
Best Tamil Feature Film National Film Award winners
Films about twin sisters
Films based on adaptations
Films based on Lottie and Lisa
Films directed by Krishnan–Panju
Films scored by M. S. Viswanathan
Films with screenplays by Javar Seetharaman
Indian children's films
Tamil films remade in other languages
Twins in Indian films